René Richard Louis Castel (6 October 1758 in Vire – 15 June 1832 in Reims) was a French poet and naturalist.

The genus Castela was named after him, honoring his works in botany.

Associated works 
 Les Plantes, poëme, Paris, Migneret, 1797.
 Histoire naturelle des poissons : avec les figures dessinées d'après nature / par Bloch ; ouvrage classé par ordres, genres et espèces, d'après le systeme de Linné ; avec les caractères génériques par René-Richard Castel, with Marcus Elieser Bloch, part of series: "Histoire naturelle de Buffon" ; t. 32–41.
 La Forêt de Fontainebleau, poëme, Paris : Deterville, an XIII-1805.
 Le prince de Catane opéra en trois actes. Paroles de M. Castel, 1813 by Nicolo Isouard, words by René Castel. (an opera after Voltaires L'Education d'un prince).

References

External links 
"René, Richard, Louis Castel". Assemblée nationale. Retrieved 30 November 2015. 

1758 births
1832 deaths
People from Vire
French naturalists
French male writers